Woodsdale–Edgewood Neighborhood Historic District is a national historic district located at Wheeling, Ohio County, West Virginia. The district encompasses 969 contributing buildings and is primarily residential, developed between 1888 and 1945. A number of popular architectural styles are represented including Shingle Style, Queen Anne, Tudor Revival, American Foursquare, Colonial Revival and Bungalow style. The district also includes four Lustron houses. Notable non-residential buildings include the Edgwood Christian Mission Alliance Church (1932), St. John's Episcopal Chapel (1913), Mount Carmel Monastery (1915) designed by Frederick F. Faris (1870-1927), and Good Shepherd Home (1912).  Also located in the district are the separately listed H. C. Ogden House and William Miles Tiernan House.

It was listed on the National Register of Historic Places in 1997.

References

National Register of Historic Places in Wheeling, West Virginia
Historic districts in Wheeling, West Virginia
Shingle Style architecture in West Virginia
Queen Anne architecture in West Virginia
Tudor Revival architecture in West Virginia
American Foursquare architecture in West Virginia
Colonial Revival architecture in West Virginia
Bungalow architecture in West Virginia
Historic districts on the National Register of Historic Places in West Virginia